Tatce is a municipality and village in Kolín District in the Central Bohemian Region of the Czech Republic. It has about 700 inhabitants.

History
The first written mention of Tatce is from 1292.

References

Villages in Kolín District